KUAT or Kuat may refer to:

 KUAT-TV, a television station (channel 6 digital) licensed to Tucson, Arizona, United States
 KUAT-FM, a radio station (90.5 FM) licensed to Tucson, Arizona, United States
 Kuat (Star Wars), a planet in the Star Wars universe 
 Kuat (drink), a Brazilian Guarana-based soft drink, produced by The Coca-Cola Company